Darling Darling is 1977 Bollywood film directed by Gogi Anand and starring Dev Anand and Zeenat Aman in lead roles.

Cast
Dev Anand as Kumar			
Zeenat Aman as Madhu 
Mehmood as Debu
Jeevan as Dr. Jeevan
Helen as Club Dancer
Sajjan as Rai Bahadur Dinanath		
Nadira as Mrs. Rai Bahadur		
Durga Khote as Kumar's Mother
Poonam Sinha as Seema
Shivraj as Advocate
Dheeraj Kumar

Soundtrack
The music of the film was composed by R. D. Burman, while lyrics were written by Anand Bakshi.

It has a popular song sung by Kishore Kumar, "Aise Na Mujhe Tum Dekho, Seene Se Laga Loonga". This song's shooting took place inside the fort at Mahabaleshwar, Maharashtra.

References

External links 
 

1970s Hindi-language films
Films scored by R. D. Burman